Francisco Bozinovic Kuscevic (6 June 1959 – 1 January 2023) was a Chilean-Croatian biologist and academic, mainly active in the field of evolutionary biology.

Life and career 
Born in Punta Arenas, Bozinovic graduated in Biology at the University of Chile in 1983 and got a PhD in Science in the same university in 1988. He was a postdoctoral fellow at the Carnegie Museum of Natural History in Pittsburgh. A member of the Chilean Academy of Sciences, he served as full professor at the Faculty of Biological Sciences of the Pontifical Catholic University of Chile. An author and co-author of over 350 scientific publications and about 20 books, during his career he received numerous accolades and honours, notably a Guggenheim Fellowship in 2010 and the 2020 National Prize for Natural Sciences. A new species of genus endemic to Chile discovered in 2016, the dromiciops bozinovici, was named after him by the Journal of Mammalogy.

Bozinovic died after a long battle against cancer on 1 January 2023, at the age of 63.

References

External links
Francisco Bozinovic at  University of Chile
Francisco Bozinovic at  Academia.edu

1959 births
2023 deaths
Chilean biologists
People from Punta Arenas
Chilean scientists
University of Chile alumni
Academic staff of the Pontifical Catholic University of Chile